The Ministry of Annadurai was the Council of Ministers, headed by C. N. Annadurai, that was formed after the fourth legislative assembly election, which was held in three phases on 15th, 18th and 21st February 1967. The results of the election were announced in February 1967, and this led to the formation of the 4th Assembly. On 6 March 1967, the Council took office.

Constitutional requirement

For the Council of Ministers to aid and advise Governor 
According to Article 163 of the Indian Constitution,

This means that the Ministers serve under the pleasure of the Governor and he/she may remove them, on the advice of the Chief Minister, whenever they want.

The Chief Minister shall be appointed by the Governor and the other Ministers shall be appointed by the Governor on the advice of the Chief Minister, and the Minister shall hold office during the pleasure of the Governor:Provided that in the States of Bihar, Madhya Pradesh and Orissa, there shall be a Minister in charge of tribal welfare who may in addition be in charge of the welfare of the Scheduled Castes and backward classes or any other work.

Council of Ministers

References 

Dravida Munnetra Kazhagam
Tamil Nadu ministries
1960s in Tamil Nadu
1969 establishments in Tamil Nadu
Cabinets established in 1969